Quina may refer to:
 Quina, California, a former settlement
 Quinoa, a grain 
 Quina, a character of Final Fantasy IX
 Quinua, Peru, a town
 La Quina, a Mousterian site in France
 Any of several plant species that yield quinine, especially those of the genus Cinchona
 Any of several unrelated plants, including those of the genus Myroxylon
 A heraldric figure of the coat of arms of Portugal
 Quina Mousterian, a variety of the Mousterian industry